Sarah Tarrant (1743 – May 13, 1828 in Salem, Massachusetts) was a nurse. She is remembered for her bravery in challenging the British soldiers who occupied Salem during military actions prior to the American Revolutionary War.

On Sunday, February 26, 1775, a battalion of British infantry, under Lieutenant Colonel Alexander Leslie, was sent to Salem to look for colonial weapons. Sarah Tarrant shouted at them from a window, "Go home and tell your master he sent you on a fool's errand and has broken the peace of our Sabbath.  Do you think we were born in the woods, to be frightened of owls?" A soldier aimed his musket at her, and she dared him, "Fire, if you have the courage, but I doubt it." No shots were fired, and the British, having found no weapons, left the town.

References 

1743 births
1828 deaths
American nurses
American women nurses
Patriots in the American Revolution
People from Salem, Massachusetts
People of Massachusetts in the American Revolution
Women in the American Revolution